Eurocup Basketball 2009–10 Qualifying Round was the qualifying round for the 2009-10 Eurocup Season. There were 16 teams that played two games each. The winners went on to the Group Stage.

Bracket

First leg

Second leg

Panellinios won by an aggregate score of 168-158 and advanced to the group stage.

Beşiktaş Cola Turka won by an aggregate score of 169-155 and advanced to the group stage.

Valencia Basket won by an aggregate score of 142-139 and advanced to the group stage.

Dynamo Moscow won by an aggregate score of 141-112 and advanced to the group stage.

BancaTercas Teramo won by an aggregate score of 150-149 and advanced to the group stage.

Hapoel Jerusalem won by an aggregate score of 169-162 and advanced to the group stage.

Brose Baskets won by an aggregate score of 129-128 and advanced to the group stage.

Bizkaia Bilbao Basket won by an aggregate score of 153-150 and advanced to the group stage.

2009–10 Eurocup Basketball